

List of tools

Technical features

References 

Programming tools
Code generation tools
Source code generation